Shahla Safi Zamir (born 14 July 1948 – 5 June 2020), better known by her stage name Marjan, was an Iranian actress and singer. The Islamic Revolution of 1979 stopped her career and for 27 years she was unable to continue her career.

Early life
Shahla Safia Zamir was born in 1948 in Tehran. Her father, Ali Safi Zamir, was a local director in the Ministry of Transport, and her mother, Kobra Bahmani Tabari, was a primary school teacher. Marjan completed her primary education at Alvand High School. At the age of 12, she was a teenage reporter for "Etelaat Koodkan", a weekly published magazine for teenagers. At the same time she was a narrator for the magazine's weekly TV program. After graduating from high school, she married Mehdi Ali-Mohammadi, (a radio and dubbing narrator). This brought her a daughter, Poopak.

Professional life 
Shahla Safia Zamir appeared in cinema at the age of 21, for the first time, in the film The World of Hope, directed by Ahmad Shirazi. At that time, another actress, Shahla Riahi, was known as Shahla, so she chose the stage name of Marjan for herself. Her marriage came to a divorce and later she married Fereydoun Jourak. Marjan started her career with cinema and took different roles in many movies.

Her husband encouraged her to become a singer as he discovered that she had a soft and strong voice. The song "Kavir Del" which she adopted from a Turkish singer made her famous. She performed many other songs after that and participated in popular TV shows. She then quilted acting and continued with her career of being a singer.

After the Islamic Revolution 
The Islamic Revolution in 1979 effectively halted her career. In 1980, two years after Iranian Revolution, Marjan was arrested and imprisoned for performing a song. Again in July 1982 she was arrested charged with supporting the People's Mojahedin of Iran. This time she was detained in Evin Prison until 1990. She, then, left Iran to live the rest of her life in the United States. In 2006 she settled in California. In an interview with Simaye Azadi TV, Marjan said that she and her Husband, Fereydoun Jurak, had been arrested, at their home, on 7 July 1982; and had been detained until early 1980. She also said, In the same interview that despite she was released from jail but, she had been banned from leaving the country for 17 years.

She fled Iran for Dubai in 2001 and eventually moved on to the United States, where she lived in Los Angeles, California until her death due to complications from surgery on 5 June 2020.

After leaving Iran, Marjan became an activist against the Iranian government and offered her support for of the People's Mojahedin Organization of Iran. "I decided to fight because I have a right to live freely in my own country," She said in an interview on 3 June 2015.

It was after performing a song "Rooyesh Nagozir" at the Organization of Iranian American Communities in Washington, DC, that Marjan started working with other artists in Mojahedin Khalq 's musical group and performed dozens of other songs including: Rooyesh Nagozir, Prohibition, Time to over thrown, what to Say, Evin Says, Let's Build a Homeland, The Martyrs of the City, The Flag, The Silent Scream, Eyes Walking and Unaware, and "we can and we must". Some of these works were made by the Iranian composer Mohammad Shams.

Death 
On 6 June 2020, following an operation, Marjan died due to a cardiac arrest. She spent the last years of her life in Los Angeles.

Maryam Rajavi, leader of the People's Mujahedin of Iran, expressed her condolences. She described Marjan as an example of female artists, "who rose up and fought the regime, are genuine representatives of the suffering of Iranian women and their passionate desire for liberation.” In a statement announcing her death, PMOI (Mojahedin Khalq) declared that She "remained committed to the cause of freedom until the last moment of her life."
Reza Moeini, the head of the Iran-Afghanistan Office of Reporters Without Borders, wrote about (Shahla Safee Zamir) Marjan's death: An Artist, political prisoners in 1990 died, "Her memory and her voice and her steadfastness against the system of ruin remain with us".

Professional career

Discography 
Her professional career as an Iranian pop singer began with famous poets and composers like Parviz Maghsadi, Fariborz Lachini, Ardalan Sarfaraz, Manoochehr Cheshm Azar, Arash Sezavar, Touraj Shabankhani, Eric Account, Reza Ashari and Mohammad Shams.

Her song, "Kavir-e Del", has been reissued in compilations such as Pomegranates - Persian Pop, Funk, Folk and Psych of the 60s And 70s by Finders Keepers Records (2009) and Khana Khana - Funk, Psychedelia And Pop from the Iranian Pre-Revolution Generation by Pharaway Sounds (2012).
 Kavir-e Del
 Golchin2 
 Konsert-e Marjan 
 Shabha-ye khatkhati
 Khatereha (Re-recordings of the old songs)
 Seke-ye mah

Filmography

References

External links

Marjan on Spotify

1948 births
2020 deaths
Iranian artists
People from Tehran
Singers from Tehran
Actresses from Tehran
Iranian women singers
Iranian film actresses
Persian-language singers
Iranian women pop singers
Iranian singer-songwriters
20th-century Iranian actresses
Iranian prisoners and detainees
20th-century Iranian women singers
Iranian emigrants to the United States
Exiles of the Iranian Revolution in the United States